Jatun Sallica (possibly from Quechua hatun big, sallika rosemary (Rosmarinus officinalis)) is a mountain in the  Vilcanota mountain range Andes of Peru, about  high. It is located in the Cusco Region, Canchis Province, San Pablo District, and in the Puno Region, Melgar Province, Nuñoa District. Jatun Sallica is situated south-west of the mountains Pomanota and Jatuncucho, south of the mountain Cochacucho and north-east of the mountain Hueco.

References

Mountains of Peru
Mountains of Cusco Region
Mountains of Puno Region